The 2nd Motorized Infantry Brigade "Stefan Cel Mare"  is an motorized infantry unit of the Moldovan National Army's Ground Forces based in the Moldovan capital of Chisinau.

Operations 
It was created on October 16, 1992, on the basis of former Soviet units of the Kishinev Garrison. Prior to its official creation, it underwent a 2-month training period, in which the units that now make up the brigade prepared for frontline service in the Transnistria War. In June 2019, it was revealed that several soldiers from the brigade were beaten, which caused the prosecutor's office to open a criminal case.

Like all the other motorized infantry brigades in the ground forces, the brigade maintains a military band which serves on special occasions.

T-34 tank 
In September 2015, on his instructions of Defense Minister Anatol Șalaru and with his personal participation, the T-34 tank mounted on the territory of the brigade in Chisinau was removed from the pedestal. According to Salaru, the tank will be exhibited in the Museum of the Soviet Occupation, along with five more monumental tanks planned for dismantling. He explained his reasoning for removing the tank as needing "to educate a new generation on other values" than what the tank represents.

References 

Military units and formations of Moldova
1992 establishments in Moldova